Flower child is a term that refers to a hippie.

Flower child may also refer to:

Film and television
 "Flower Child" (Earth 2), a television episode
 "Flower Child" (Once Upon a Time), a television episode
 "Flower Child" (The Outer Limits), a television episode
 Flower Child Coffin, the fictional protagonist of the 1973 film Coffy

Songs
 "Flower Child", by Eddie Murphy from Love's Alright, 1993
 "Flower Child", by the Higgins from Real Thing, 2008
 "Flower Child", by Lenny Kravitz from Let Love Rule, 1989
 "Flower Child", by Nitty Scott, 2013
 "Flower Child", by the Reseptors, competing to represent Finland in the Eurovision Song Contest 2000
 "Flower Child", by U2 from The Complete U2, 2004

Other uses
 Flower Child, a 1988 poetry collection by Uche Nduka
 Flower Child, a Thoroughbred racehorse, dam of Desert Orchid